= The Psychology of Money =

Book by Morgan Housel

- Cover
- Author: Morgan Housel
- Language: English
- Publisher: Harriman House
- Publication date: 2020
- Publication place: United States
- ISBN: 978-0857197689

The Psychology of Money is a book by Morgan Housel, published in 2020. It examines how people think about money and how behaviour and emotions influence financial decisions.

== Overview ==
The book is organised as a series of short chapters that use stories and examples to explain psychological biases and common mistakes people make with money. It argues that success with money depends less on technical skill and more on behaviour, patience and perspective.

== Reception ==
A Financial Times review stated that The Psychology of Money makes a persuasive case that financial decisions are shaped more by human behaviour than by data.

Forbes noted that The Psychology of Money effectively shows how emotions and behaviour shape financial decisions, praising its accessible approach to personal finance.

The Economic Times highlighted that the book emphasises building wealth quietly through savings and investments rather than flashy spending, arguing that “real wealth is invisible, not on social media handles.” It also applauded the author for stressing the relevance of habits like saving without a specific goal and benefiting from long-term compounding, calling those ideas vital tools for long-term wealth creation.

== Editions ==
The book was published in 2020. The original publisher in the UK edition is Harriman House.

== Author ==
Housel has also published:

- "Same as Ever: Timeless Lessons on Risk, Opportunity and Living a Good Life" (2023) UK and Commonwealth Edition ISBN 978-1804090633
- "Same as Ever: A Guide to What Never Changes" (2023) North American Edition ISBN 978-0593332702
- "The Art of Spending Money: Simple Choices for a Richer Life" (2025) ISBN 978-1804091890
